Désiré Guillaume Édouard Monnais (27 May 1798 – 25 February 1868) was a French journalist, theater director, playwright and librettist.

Life and career
Édouard Monnais was born in Paris and began his career as a journalist. In 1835, he became chief editor of the Revue et Gazette musicale de Paris. In 1836 he took a position at the Interior Ministry and in 1838 became Commissioner of Opera and soon afterward, the Paris Conservatory. From 15 November1839 to the end of May 1841, he co-directed the Paris Opera with Henri Duponchel.

Monnais wrote as a critic for Revue et gazette musicale de Paris and Le Courrier français, during which time he reviewed the work of artists including Balzac and Verdi. He was active in the support of music and opera, serving as Vice-chairman of the Association of Artists-Musicians, and also on juries, artistic committees and in support of competitions including the Prix de Rome.

Monnais sometimes wrote under the pseudonym of Paul Smith. He retired from public service a month before his death, and died in Paris after a lengthy illness. His funeral was held in the Notre Dame de Lorette and he was buried in the Père Lachaise Cemetery.

Works
Selected works include:
Midi, ou l'Abdication d'une femme, a comedy-vaudeville act in collaboration, Paris, Theatre du Vaudeville, Feb. 2, 1826
Le Futur de la grand'maman, a comedy in one act, mingled with couplets, with Emmanuel Arago and Armand d'Artois, Paris, New Theatre, June 13, 1827
La Première cause, ou le Jeune avocat, in a comedy-vaudeville act, with Paul Duport, Paris, Theatre de Madame, November 5, 1829
La Contre-lettre, ou le Jésuite, a drama in two acts, mixed with song, with Paul Duport, Paris, New Theatre, Aug. 23, 1830
La Demande en mariage, ou le Jésuite retourné, in a comedy-vaudeville act, with Emmanuel Arago and Armand d'Artois in Paris, Variety Theatre, September 12, 1830
Les Trois Catherine, historical scenes of Henry VIII, vaudeville, with Paul Duport, music by Adolphe Adam and Casimir Gide, Paris, New Theatre, Nov. 18, 1830
La Cour des messageries, tableau-in a vaudeville act with Auguste Lecerf, Paris, Theatre Ambigu Comique, April 10, 1831
La Dédaigneuse, a comedy-vaudeville act, with Paul Duport, Paris, Theatre du Vaudeville, Nov. 18, 1831
L'Anneau, ou Départ et retour, comedy-vaudeville in two acts, in cooperation, Paris, Theatre Ambigu Comique, Dec. 3, 1832
Le Cavalier servant, ou les Mœurs italiennes, a comedy act, mixed with songs, with Paul Duport, Paris, Theatre du Vaudeville, April 25, 1833
Le Capitaine Roland, comedy-vaudeville in one act, working in Paris, Theatre du Vaudeville, June 23, 1834
La Dame d'honneur, comic opera in one act, with Paul Duport, music by M. Boileau, Paris, Opera Comique, October 4, 1838
Un ménage parisien, a drama in two acts, with Laurencin, Paris, gym-Dramatic Theatre, June 12, 1839
Miss Kelly, ou La Lettre et l'engagement, in a comedy act and in prose, with Paul Duport, Paris, Theatre de la Renaissance, 25 October 1839
Le Cent-Suisse, comic opera in one act, with Paul Duport, Paris, Opera Comique, June 17, 1840
Sultana, comic opera in one act, music Maurice Bourges, Paris, Opera Comique, September 16, 1846
Mimili, ou Souvenirs d'un officier français dans une vallée suisse, 1827
Éphémérides universelles, ou Tableau religieux, politique, littéraire, scientifique et anecdotique, présentant pour chaque jour de l'année un extrait des annales de toutes les nations et de tous les siècles, 13 volumes, 1828-1833
Esquisses de la vie d'artiste, 2 vols., 1844
Les Sept notes de la gamme, 1848

References

 Fontaine, Gerard (2003). Visages de marbre et d'airain: La collection de bustes du Palais Garnier. Paris: Monum, Éditions du patrimoine. .

1798 births
1868 deaths
French theatre managers and producers
Directors of the Paris Opera
19th-century French journalists
French opera librettists
Writers from Paris
French critics
Burials at Père Lachaise Cemetery
19th-century French dramatists and playwrights
19th-century French male writers
French male non-fiction writers